Majid Akhshabi, is an Iranian Santurist and Persian Pop singer.

Discography

Studio albums

 Gomgashteh (The Lost)  , 2003 Hamavaz Ahang
 Hamraaz , 2005 Hamavaz Ahang
 Parizad (Iranian Pop Music) , 2006 Soroush Multimedia Inc

References

External links
Majid Akhshabi Official site

Majid Akhshabi on Spotify

1973 births
Living people
Iranian composers
Iranian folk singers
21st-century Iranian male singers
Iranian pop singers
Iranian singer-songwriters
Iranian music arrangers
Iranian guitarists
Iranian santur players
Singers from Tehran
21st-century guitarists